Thailand competed at the 2016 Asian Beach Games held in Danang, Vietnam from 24 September to 3 October 2016.

Competitors
Thailand competed at the 2016 Asian Beach Games in 20 out of the 22 sports. Team Thailand did not compete in Vietnamese Martial Arts and Vovinam.

Medal summary

Medal by sport

Medal by date

Medalists

References

External links 
Official website

2016
Asian Beach Games
Nations at the 2016 Asian Beach Games